Licswm  is a small village in Flintshire, Wales. It is part of the community of Ysceifiog.

Licswm was formerly a mining village, and one explanation of its unusual name was that it was given to it by miners who moved to the area from Derbyshire: in their dialect "likesome", or "licksome", was an adjective meaning "pleasant". It may have been referred to as Lixwm Green, or Licsum Green, for a period in the 19th century.

Lewis's 1843 Topographical Dictionary of Wales noted that at that time the majority of the population of Ysceifiog parish lived in Licswm and were mainly employed in mines in the neighbouring parishes. Even at that time, however, the population was declining due to the closure of some mines.

References

Villages in Flintshire